The rectangular function (also known as the rectangle function, rect function, Pi function, Heaviside Pi function, gate function, unit pulse, or the normalized boxcar function) is defined as

Alternative definitions of the function define  to be 0, 1, or undefined.

Its periodic version is called a rectangular wave.

History

Relation to the boxcar function
The rectangular function is a special case of the more general boxcar function:

Fourier transform of the rectangular function

The unitary Fourier transforms of the rectangular function are

using ordinary frequency , where  is the normalized form of the sinc function and

using angular frequency , where  is the unnormalized form of the sinc function.

Note that as long as the definition of the pulse function is only motivated by its behavior in the time-domain experience, there is no reason to believe that the oscillatory interpretation (i.e. the Fourier transform function) should be intuitive, or directly understood by humans. However, some aspects of the theoretical result may be understood intuitively, as finiteness in time domain corresponds to an infinite frequency response. (Vice versa, a finite Fourier transform will correspond to infinite time domain response.)

Relation to the triangular function
We can define the triangular function as the convolution of two rectangular functions:

Use in probability

Viewing the rectangular function as a probability density function, it is a special case of the continuous uniform distribution with  The characteristic function is

and its moment-generating function is

where  is the hyperbolic sine function.

Rational approximation
The pulse function may also be expressed as a limit of a rational function:

Demonstration of validity
First, we consider the case where  Notice that the term  is always positive for integer  However,  and hence  approaches zero for large 

It follows that:

Second, we consider the case where  Notice that the term  is always positive for integer  However,  and hence  grows very large for large 

It follows that:

Third, we consider the case where  We may simply substitute in our equation:

We see that it satisfies the definition of the pulse function. Therefore,

See also
Fourier transform
Square wave
Step function
Top-hat filter

References

Special functions